Tessella jorgenseni is a moth in the family Erebidae. It was described by William Schaus in 1921. It is found in Paraguay.

References

Moths described in 1921
Phaegopterina